The 2023 Chinese presidential election was held on 10 March 2023, at the 14th National People's Congress to indirectly elect the President and the Vice President of China. The President is the second-highest office under General Secretary of the Chinese Communist Party (paramount leader). However, the presidency has been held by the CCP general secretary since 1993. The term limit on the presidency was removed at the 2018 National People's Congress, bringing the presidency into alignment with the position of CCP general secretary, which does not have term limits. Current CCP general secretary Xi Jinping, who was expected to be re-elected, was unanimously elected for an unprecedented third term as president in 2023.

See also

 20th National Congress of the Chinese Communist Party
 Xi Jinping Administration
 Succession of power in China

References 

2023 in China
2023 elections in China
Xi Jinping
Single-candidate elections